Malone Golf Club is a golf club located near Belfast, Northern Ireland.

History
The club, founded in 1895, hosted the 1933 Irish Open, won by Bob Kenyon.

Scorecards

Drumbridge

Ballydrain

References

External links

Facebook page

Golf clubs and courses in Northern Ireland
Sports venues in County Antrim
Tourist attractions in County Antrim
Irish Open (golf) venues
1895 establishments in Ireland
Sports venues completed in 1895